Sekolah Kebangsaan Simpang Lima, Klang (better known as just SK Simpang Lima, Klang) is a primary school in Klang, Selangor in Malaysia. The school was founded in 1957.

In 1963, the enrollment increased and this forced the school to be divided into two sessions. Both the morning and afternoon session are administered separately by different principals and have different teachers. The two-session schools are officially known as Sekolah Rendah Kebangsaan (1) Simpang Lima, Klang and Sekolah Rendah Kebangsaan (2) Simpang Lima, Klang and they changed sessions with one another every other year.

The original school block was designed with the main two storey block facing a huge sports field (behind Sekolah Tengku Ampuan Rahimah), with a driveway and foyer under the administration office. The block had a covered walkway surrounding an internal square with two badminton courts. The courts also doubled as the student assembly point.

In the 1970s, there are three classes for each academic year. Based on the colours of traffic lights, they are Hijau (Green), Kuning (Yellow) and Merah (Red). Originally an all-boys primary school, Sekolah Rendah Kebangsaan (2) Simpang Lima finally became co-ed when two girls (Ms Sheila Devi Harikrishnan and Ms Norabani bt Ab Rashid) were admitted for Standard 5 in 1981.

Later in mid-1990s, the Ministry of Education changed the name of all primary schools, dropping the term "Rendah" and thus Sekolah Rendah Kebangsaan (1) Simpang Lima, Klang and Sekolah Rendah Kebangsaan (2) Simpang Lima, Klang are known just as Sekolah Kebangsaan (1) Simpang Lima, Klang and Sekolah Kebangsaan (2) Simpang Lima, Klang respectively.

See also
 Klang
 Persiaran Raja Muda Musa
 La Salle School, Klang
 SMK Tengku Ampuan Rahimah
 List of schools in Selangor

Primary schools in Malaysia
Educational institutions established in 1957
1957 establishments in Malaya
Publicly funded schools in Malaysia
Schools in Selangor